Yenghe hatam is one of the four major prayer formulas (the other three being Ashem Vohu, Ahuna Vairya and Airyaman ishya) of the Gathic canon, that is, part of the group of texts composed in the more archaic dialect of the Avestan language and believed to have been composed by Zoroaster.

Text and interpretation 
ýenghê hâtãm âat ýesne

paitî vanghô mazdå ahurô

vaêthâ ashât hacâ ýånghãmcâ

tãscâ tåoscâ ýazamaide.The Pahlavi and Parsi Avestan translations read:That one (masculine or neuter singular) of the beings indeed is for worship
who Mazda Ahura knows as better according to righteousness
from the female beings also
These ones (masculine) and these ones (feminine) we worship (the Amesha Spentas and Yazatas).Vazquez's liturgically inclined translation is:They that are,
Who are of any gender,
Ahura Mazda knows through Asha of their glorious sacrifices:
Thus we offer them worship!

References

External links 
Other texts on the religion of Ahura Mazda
http://www.zoroastrian.org/GathaSongs/supplements2.htm
http://www.zoroaster.com/

Zoroastrian prayer